Khwaja Abu Nasr Ahmad, better known as Ahmad Shirazi, also known as Ahmad(-e) Abd al-Samad, was a Persian vizier of the Ghaznavid Sultan Mas'ud I and the latter's son Mawdud from 1032 to 1043. He was the son of the Samanid secretary Abu Tahir Shirazi, and had a son named Abd al-Hamid Shirazi, who would also later serve as vizier. He was originally from the city of Shiraz.

Sources 
 
 
 
 
 

Year of birth unknown
1040s deaths
12th-century Iranian people
Ghaznavid viziers
People from Shiraz
Ghaznavid officials
Ghaznavid generals